Tim Anderson is an American computer programmer who helped create the adventure game Zork, one of the first works of interactive fiction and an early descendant of ADVENT (also known as Colossal Cave Adventure). The first version of Zork was written in 1977–1979 in the MDL programming language on a DEC PDP-10 computer by Anderson, Marc Blank, Bruce Daniels, and Dave Lebling. All four were members of the Dynamic Modeling Group at the MIT Laboratory for Computer Science.

References
https://web.archive.org/web/20090116035446/http://www.csd.uwo.ca/Infocom/Articles/NZT/zorkhist.html

Infocom
Living people
People from Sudbury, Massachusetts
Video game programmers
Year of birth missing (living people)